West Muskingum High School is a public high school in Zanesville, Ohio, United States.

Curriculum
Educational opportunities include a challenging "College Prep" curriculum, a post secondary enrollment options program, general studies, in-house vocational programs in business, life skills, technology, and agriculture, and 25 vocational programs are offered through the Vocational School District.  West Muskingum also provides instruction for the developmentally handicapped and learning disabled. Advanced placement courses are offered in English, Chemistry, Calculus, and History.

Extracurricular activities
Student organizations include chess club, college club, Fellowship of Christian Athletes, Future Business Leaders of America, FFA, fishing club, Key Club, National Honor Society, pep club, quiz team, Students Against Destructive Decisions, ski club and TEAMS (Test of Engineering Aptitude, Mathematics, and Science).

Athletics
West Muskingum teams, known as the Tornadoes, compete in Ohio High School Athletic Association classification AA for the boys' teams and AAA for the girls' teams. The teams are in OHSAA District II and the Muskingum Valley League. West Muskingum Tornadoes teams include baseball, basketball, cheerleading, cross country, dance team (Twisters), football, golf, soccer, softball, swimming, track and field, volleyball, and wrestling.

Performing arts
Performing arts opportunities available to West Muskingum students include choir, concert band, jazz band, pep band, theater and the Tornado Marching Band.

Notable alumni
Jeff Stone, member of the Wisconsin State Assembly, 1998–2013

Shane Tilton, the 2018 Young Stationers’ Prize award winner

References

External links
West Muskingum High School
West Muskingum Homepage
West Muskingum Bands

Educational institutions established in 1962
High schools in Muskingum County, Ohio
Public high schools in Ohio